Iritana Hohaia (born 1 March 2000) is a New Zealand rugby union player. She plays halfback for Taranaki provincially and for Hurricanes Poua professionally. She has been named in the Black Ferns squad but has not made her test debut.

Personal life 
Hohaia was born in Ōpunake in Taranaki. She began playing club rugby at Coastal as a child and has also played representative Basketball.

Rugby career 
Hohaia won a gold medal with the New Zealand Sevens team at the 2018 Youth Olympics in Buenos Aires. She was named Taranaki Whio's Player of the Year in 2019. In 2020, she played for the Possibles against the Probables in a Black Ferns trial match and then later appeared for the New Zealand Barbarians against the Black Ferns.

For 2021 she was selected for the Black Ferns squad for two test matches against England and France. Hohaia was contracted by the Hurricanes Poua for their first-ever women's squad for the inaugural season of Super Rugby Aupiki.

References

External links 

 Black Ferns Profile

2000 births
Living people
New Zealand women's international rugby union players
New Zealand female rugby union players
New Zealand female rugby sevens players
Rugby sevens players at the 2018 Summer Youth Olympics
Youth Olympic gold medalists for New Zealand
21st-century New Zealand women